is a Japanese rower from Ishikawa Prefecture. He competed in the men's lightweight double sculls event at the 2016 Summer Olympics.

References

External links
 

1987 births
Living people
Japanese male rowers
Olympic rowers of Japan
Rowers at the 2016 Summer Olympics
Hitotsubashi University alumni
Sportspeople from Ishikawa Prefecture